Djesse Vol. 1 is the first album in the Djesse series by Jacob Collier. The album features the Metropole Orkest, and was released on 7 December 2018. Djesse is a planned collection of four volumes which was announced 29 October 2018. Each record represents a different part of the day, with the first record describing daybreak. The title Djesse, which is pronounced with a silent D, is a reference to Collier's own initials.

The songs in this volume feature numerous styles, and reviewers have drawn parallels to such composers and musicians as Stravinsky and J Dilla. The third track, "With the Love in My Heart", was released 2 November 2018 as a single, in anticipation of the album's release. Two further singles, "Ocean Wide, Canyon Deep" and "All Night Long", were released on 29 November. The volume features collaborations with Voces8, Laura Mvula, Hamid El Kasri, Take 6, and Collier's mother, Suzie Collier. The Metropole Orkest is featured heavily throughout the record, appearing on every track other than "Home Is". Collier produced, arranged and orchestrated the music himself.

The album was number one on the Billboard Contemporary Jazz chart. The track "All Night Long" won the award for Best Arrangement, Instrumental and Vocals at the 62nd Annual Grammy Awards.

Prior to the album's release, Collier had performed all the songs except for the first three tracks live at his BBC Proms concert in July 2018. On the day after the release of the album, before starting on his Djesse world tour, he performed the volume with musicians from both Berklee College of Music and MIT.

Track listing

Charts

References 

Jacob Collier albums
2018 albums